Philibert Gnagno Fagnidi (born 1953 in Gagnoa) is an Ivorian diplomat and the Ambassador Extraordinary and Plenipotentiary of :Côte d'Ivoire to the Russian Federation.

Fagnidi, as Ambassador of Côte d'Ivoire to Russia, presented his Letters of Credence to Russian President Vladimir Putin on 13 April 2007, and has concurrent accreditation as Ambassador of Côte d'Ivoire to Latvia, Georgia, Lithuania, Azerbaijan, Ukraine, Estonia and Belarus.

References 

Ivorian diplomats
Ambassadors of Ivory Coast to Russia
Living people
1953 births
Ambassadors of Ivory Coast to Latvia
Ambassadors of Ivory Coast to Georgia (country)
Ambassadors of Ivory Coast to Lithuania
Ambassadors of Ivory Coast to Azerbaijan
Ambassadors of Ivory Coast to Ukraine
Ambassadors of Ivory Coast to Estonia
Ambassadors of Ivory Coast to Belarus
People from Gagnoa